This is a list of notable pastry chefs. A pastry chef is a station chef in a professional kitchen, skilled in the making of pastries, desserts, breads and other baked goods. They are employed in large hotels, bistros, restaurants, bakeries, and some cafés.

Pastry chefs

 Dominique Ansel
 Antonio Bachour 
 Florian Bellanger 
 Ron Ben-Israel 
 Willem Berkhoff 
 Wayne Harley Brachman 
 Sébastien Canonne
 Philippe Conticini 
 Cheryl Day
 Elizabeth Falkner 
 Gale Gand 
 Duff Goldman 
 Carine Goren
 Shayne Greenman 
  Cédric Grolet
 Tariq Hanna 
 Maida Heatter 
 Pierre Hermé 
 Johnny Iuzzini 
 Cheryl Koh
 Beulah Levy Ledner 
 Alain LeNôtre 
 Gaston Lenôtre 
 Nicholas Lodge 
 Norman Love 
 Emily Luchetti 
 Jean-Philippe Maury 
 Roland Mesnier 
 Ho Chi Minh 
 Melissa Murphy 
 Candace Nelson 
 Ghaya Oliveira
 Anna Olson 
 Pichet Ong 
 François Payard 
 Jacquy Pfeiffer
 Claire Ptak
 Marc Rivière
 Alain Roby 
 Jordi Roca i Fontané
 Albert Roux
 Michel Roux
 S. G. Sender 
 Sally Seymour 
 Heny Sison 
 Greggy Soriano 
 Yves Thuriès 
 Jacques Torres 
 Christina Tosi
 Buddy Valastro
 Rudolph van Veen
 Bronwen Weber 
 William Yosses
 Pierrick Boyer

See also

 List of bakers
 List of chefs
 White House Executive Pastry Chef

References

Pastry chefs
Pastry